Thanks To is a Korean-language EP by South Korean rock band F.T. Island, released on 23 September 2013 by FNC Entertainment. Several of the songs were composed by the band members. Memory reached first place on Taiwanese Qmusic Chart, while the EP itself was placed first on the G-MUSIC weekly chart, with a 28,84% share among Asian releases. The band first played the songs from Thanks To during their FTHX concerts in Seoul on 28 and 29 September, drawing an audience of 6,000.

Track listing

References

2013 EPs
F.T. Island EPs
FNC Entertainment EPs
Korean-language EPs